Niehl Sebastianstraße is the northern terminal station of Cologne Stadtbahn line 16, located in Cologne district of Niehl. The station was opened in 1992.

See also 
 List of Cologne KVB stations

External links 
 station info page 

Cologne KVB stations
Nippes, Cologne